The 1988 NAIA World Series was the 32nd annual tournament hosted by the National Association of Intercollegiate Athletics to determine the national champion of baseball among its member colleges and universities in the United States and Canada.

The tournament was played at Harris Field in Lewiston, Idaho.

Hometown team and defending champions Lewis–Clark State (45–20) defeated Grand Canyon (49–20) in a single-game championship series, 9–3, to win the Warriors' fourth NAIA World Series. This would go on to be the second of six consecutive World Series championships for the program.

Lewis–Clark State pitcher Steve Callahan was named tournament MVP.

Bracket

Preliminary bracket

Championship bracket

See also
 1988 NCAA Division I baseball tournament
 1988 NCAA Division II baseball tournament
 1988 NCAA Division III baseball tournament
 1988 NAIA Softball World Series

Reference

|NAIA World Series
NAIA World Series
NAIA World Series
NAIA World Series